Francesco Chicco was an Italian rower who competed in the 1930s. From 1932 to 1934, he was three times European champion in the coxed four event.

References

Year of birth missing
Year of death missing
Italian male rowers
European Rowing Championships medalists